Solving chess consists of finding an optimal strategy for the game of chess; that is, one by which one of the players (White or Black) can always force a victory, or either can force a draw (see solved game). It also means more generally solving chess-like games (i.e. combinatorial games of perfect information), such as Capablanca chess and infinite chess. 

In a weaker sense, solving chess may refer to proving which one of the three possible outcomes (White wins; Black wins; draw) is the result of two perfect players, without necessarily revealing the optimal strategy itself (see indirect proof).

No complete solution for chess in either of the two senses is known, nor is it expected that chess will be solved in the near future (if ever). There is disagreement on whether the current exponential growth of computing power will continue long enough to someday allow for solving it by "brute force", i.e. by checking all possibilities.

Progress to date is extremely limited; there are tablebases of perfect endgame play with a small number of pieces (up to seven), and some chess variants have been solved at least weakly. Calculated estimates of game tree complexity and state-space complexity of chess exist which provide a bird's eye view of the computational effort that might be required to solve the game.

Partial results

Endgame tablebases

Endgame tablebases are computerized databases that contain precalculated exhaustive analyses of positions with small numbers of pieces remaining on the board. Tablebases have solved chess to a limited degree, determining perfect play in a number of endgames, including all non-trivial endgames with no more than seven pieces or pawns (including the two kings).

One consequence of developing the seven-piece endgame tablebase is that many interesting theoretical chess endings have been found. One example is a mate-in-546 position, which with perfect play is a forced checkmate in 546 moves, ignoring the 50-move rule. Such a position is beyond the ability of any human to solve, and no chess engine plays it correctly, either, without access to the tablebase. As of January 2023, the longest forced mating sequence was discovered for the 8-man tablebase (also ignoring the 50-move rule), which was discovered in mid-2022 by developer, computer chess enthusiast, and physicist Marc Bourzutschky. The 8-man tablebase is currently incomplete, though, so it is not guaranteed that this is the absolute limit for the 8-man tablebase.

Chess variants

A variant first described by Shannon provides an argument about the game-theoretic value of chess: he proposes allowing the move of “pass”. In this variant, it is provable with a strategy stealing argument that the first player has at least a draw thus: if the first player has a winning move, let him play it, else pass. The second player now faces the same situation owing to the mirror image symmetry of the board: if the first player had no winning move in the first instance, the second player has none now. Therefore the second player can at best draw, and the first player can at least draw, so a perfect game results in the first player winning or drawing.

Some chess variants which are simpler than chess have been solved. A winning strategy for black in Maharajah and the Sepoys can be easily memorised. The 5×5 Gardner's Minichess variant has been weakly solved as a draw. Although losing chess is played on an 8x8 board, its forced capture rule greatly limits its complexity and a computational analysis managed to weakly solve this variant as a win for white.

The prospect of solving individual, specific, chess-like games becomes more difficult as the board-size is increased, such as in large chess variants, and infinite chess.

The complexity of chess
Information theorist Claude Shannon in 1950 outlined a theoretical procedure for playing a perfect game (i.e. solving chess):  

Shannon then went on to estimate that solving chess according to that procedure would require comparing some 10 possible game variations, or having a "dictionary" denoting an optimal move for each of the approximately 10  possible board positions (currently known to be about 5x10 ).
The number of mathematical operations required to solve chess, however, may be significantly different than the number of operations required to produce the entire game-tree of chess. In particular, if White has a forced win, only a subset of the game-tree would require evaluation to confirm that a forced-win exists (i.e. with no refutations from Black). Furthermore, Shannon's calculation for the complexity of chess assumes an average game length of 40 moves, but there is no mathematical basis to say that a forced win by either side would have any relation to this game length. Indeed, some expertly played games (grandmaster-level play) have been as short as 16 moves. For these reasons, mathematicians and game theorists have been reluctant to categorically state that solving chess is an intractable problem.

Predictions on when or if chess will be solved
In 1950, Shannon calculated, based on a game tree complexity of 10 and a computer operating at one megahertz (a big stretch at that time: the UNIVAC 1 introduced in 1951 could perform ~2000 operations per second or 2 kilohertz) that could evaluate a terminal node in 1 microsecond would take 10 years to make its first move.  Solving chess would therefore seem beyond any possible technology at that time.

Hans-Joachim Bremermann, a professor of mathematics and biophysics at the University of California at Berkeley, further argued in a 1965 paper that the "speed, memory, and processing capacity of any possible future computer equipment are limited by specific physical barriers: the light barrier, the quantum barrier, and the thermodynamical barrier. These limitations imply, for example, that no computer, however constructed, will ever be able to examine the entire tree of possible move sequences of the game of chess." Nonetheless, Bremermann did not foreclose the possibility that a computer would someday be able to solve chess. He wrote, "In order to have a computer play a perfect or nearly perfect game, it will be necessary either to analyze the game completely ... or to analyze the game in an approximate way and combine this with a limited amount of tree searching. ... A theoretical understanding of such heuristic programming, however, is still very much wanting."

Recent scientific advances have not significantly changed these assessments. The game of checkers was (weakly) solved in 2007, but it has roughly the square root of the number of positions in chess. Jonathan Schaeffer, the scientist who led the effort, said a breakthrough such as quantum computing would be needed before solving chess could even be attempted, but he does not rule out the possibility, saying that the one thing he learned from his 16-year effort of solving checkers "is to never underestimate the advances in technology".

See also
 Shannon number (a calculation of the lower bound of the game-tree complexity of chess)
 First-move advantage in chess

References

External links
"Infinite Chess, PBS Infinite Series" Infinite Chess, PBS Infinite Series.

Chess theory
Game theory